Calle 13 may refer to:

 Calle 13 (TV channel), a Spanish-based cable/satellite channel
 Calle 13 (band), a Puerto Rican urban/hip hop band
Calle 13 (album), their debut album 
The namesake of the group, a street in Puerto Rico